Alan Grant (born 21 April 1948) is an Australian former professional darts player who competed in events of the British Darts Organisation (BDO) in the 1970s and 1980s.

Career 
Grant made his debut at the 1979 WDF World Cup, losing to John Wilkie from New Zealand.

He won the 1979 New South Wales Darts Masters by beating Australia's Frank Palko.

Grant won the 1980 Australian Grand Masters by beating Ray Cornibert from England.

Grant played in the 1980 BDO World Darts Championship and defeated Canadian Allan Hogg in the first round 2–1. This was considered an upset since Hogg had reached the World Masters final three months earlier. Grant was eventually beaten in the second round 0–2 by Ceri Morgan from Wales.

World Championship results

BDO 
 1980: Second Round (lost to Ceri Morgan 1–2) (sets)

External links 
Profile and Stats on Darts Database

Australian darts players
Living people
British Darts Organisation players
1948 births